Lower Menadue (meaning black hill) is a hamlet in the parish of Luxulyan, Cornwall, England, UK. It is in the civil parish of Treverbyn

References

Hamlets in Cornwall